The Rough Guide to the Music of Portugal is a world music compilation album originally released in 1998. Part of the World Music Network Rough Guides series, the album spotlights the music of Portugal, focusing on acoustic fado from the 1970s, 80s, and 90s. Co-founders of the World Music Network Phil Stanton and Sandra Alayón-Stanton produced and coordinated the album, respectively.

Critical reception

Writing for AllMusic, Alex Henderson called the disc "an excellent place to start" for new listeners to fado, awarding it four and half stars.

Track listing

References

External links 
 

1998 compilation albums
World Music Network Rough Guide albums
World music albums by Portuguese artists